Karianne Gåsland Bjellånes (born 9 August 1986 in Mo i Rana, Helgeland) is a Norwegian cross-country skier. She represents Henning SL, and lives in Trondheim.

She made her World Cup debut in March 2007 in Drammen, and collected her first World Cup points in that race with a 27th place. She finished among the top fifteen for the first time in February 2008 in Stockholm, with a 13th place; and finished eleventh in March 2008 in Drammen.

Cross-country skiing results
All results are sourced from the International Ski Federation (FIS).

World Cup

Season standings

References

External links

Profile at Team Trøndelag

1986 births
Living people
People from Rana, Norway
Norwegian female cross-country skiers
Sportspeople from Nordland